Should We Wed Them? (French: Faut-il les marier ?) is a 1932 French comedy film directed by Pierre Billon and Carl Lamac and starring Anny Ondra, Lucien Baroux and Marcelle Praince. It is the French-language version of the Austrian film The Cruel Mistress.

The film's sets were designed by Otto Erdmann and Hans Sohnle.

Cast
 Anny Ondra as Anny  
 Lucien Baroux as Prof. Bock  
 Marcelle Praince as Miss Flora  
 Jean-Pierre Aumont as Jim  
 Charles Lamy as Prof. Petou  
 Rachel Launay as Mrs. Bock  
 Henri Kerny as The inspector

References

Bibliography 
 Crisp, Colin. Genre, Myth and Convention in the French Cinema, 1929-1939. Indiana University Press, 2002.

External links 
 

1932 comedy films
French comedy films
1932 films
1930s French-language films
Films directed by Pierre Billon
Films directed by Karel Lamač
French multilingual films
French black-and-white films
1932 multilingual films
Films with screenplays by Henri-Georges Clouzot
1930s French films